"Cool" (stylized as "C O O L") is the debut single by American electronic musician, DJ, and producer Le Youth. The song was released in the United Kingdom as a digital download on June 28, 2013 and in the United States on July 2, 2013. The song has peaked to number 26 on the UK Singles Chart and number 19 on the Danish Singles Chart. The song heavily samples Cassie's song "Me & U". It rapidly received over 200,000 plays on SoundCloud in a short period of time.

Music video
A music video to accompany the release of "Cool" was first released onto YouTube on April 10, 2013 at a total length of three minutes and thirty-four seconds.

Track listing

Chart performance

Weekly charts

Year-end charts

Release history

References

2013 debut singles
Le Youth songs
2013 songs
Ultra Music singles
Songs written by Ryan Leslie